Jack Citrin is an American political scientist. He is the director of the Institute of Governmental Studies and a professor emeritus of Political Science at the University of California, Berkeley. He is the co-author and co-editor of several books about national identity and tax resistance.

Early life
Citrin was born in Shanghai, and he grew up in Hong Kong and Tokyo, Japan. He is of Russian-Jewish descent. He graduated from McGill University, and he earned a PhD from the University of California, Berkeley.

Career
Citrin is a professor emeritus of Political Science at the University of California, Berkeley. He has served as the director of the Institute of Governmental Studies since 2007.

Citrin is the (co-)author and (co-) editor of several books about national identity and tax resistance, including two with David O. Sears. Their first book together, Tax Revolt: Something for Nothing in California, published in 1982, was an analysis of the 1978 California Proposition 13. In a review for Political Science Quarterly, Alvin Rabushka suggested, "the book says virtually nothing about the effects of Proposition 13 on the state's economy, its public services, or its political and judicial processes." He added that "their obsession with symbolic racism is wholly unwarranted, both analytically and from a public policy perspective," and he concluded by dismissing the book as "hard to read, because it is written in the language of social psychology and social science jargon."

In American Identity and the Politics of Multiculturalism, published in 2014, Citrin and Sears studied multiculturalism in relation to civic nationalism versus nativism and patriotism versus chauvinism, and found that most American citizens were patriotic civic nationalists. In a review for Contemporary Sociology, Rhys H. Williams concluded, "This is an optimistic book for those who share a liberal conception of American national identity, culture, and public life" and he added that "they recognize how those most disadvantaged by our current political economy, most specifically African Americans, are at least "on board" with rosy assessments of the nation." However, in a 2017 interview, Citrin admitted that this may have changed due to the "hardening of differences in the political parties."

Personal life
Citrin married Leland Rubin in 1964. He is a naturalized U.S. citizen.

Selected works

References

Living people
American people of Russian-Jewish descent
People with acquired American citizenship
McGill University alumni
University of California, Berkeley College of Letters and Science faculty
University of California, Berkeley alumni
American political scientists
Year of birth missing (living people)